Nogaye Lo Sylla (born 23 August 1996) is a Spanish basketball player from Mallorca who plays for Lointek Gernika Bizkaia and the Spanish national team. She is considered one of the most promising centers of Spanish basketball.

Club career 
Born to Senegalese parents, Lo started playing basketball at Sant José Obrero school and then in IES CTEIB high school in native Palma de Mallorca. She started playing professionally at Celta de Vigo Baloncesto in 2013 and CB Antratx the following season, both in Spanish second-tier league. In 2015 she started playing in the first tier league when she signed for Mann Filter Zaragoza. The next two seasons she played for Cadì La Seu. In June 2018 she signed for Quesos El Pastor. In 2019 she signed for Lointek Gernika Bizkaia.

EuroCup statistics

National team
Lo started playing with Spain's youth teams at 15, winning a total of five medals from 2012 to 2016. She made her debut with the senior team in 2016, when she was 19 years old.
  2012 FIBA Europe Under-16 Championship (youth)
  2012 FIBA Under-17 World Championship (youth)
  2013 FIBA Europe Under-18 Championship (youth)
  2015 FIBA Europe Under-20 Championship (youth)
 4th 2015 FIBA Under-19 World Championship (youth)
  2016 FIBA Europe Under-20 Championship (youth)

References

1996 births
Living people
Sportspeople from Palma de Mallorca
Spanish women's basketball players
Centers (basketball)
European Games competitors for Spain
Basketball players at the 2019 European Games
Competitors at the 2018 Mediterranean Games
Mediterranean Games silver medalists for Spain
Mediterranean Games medalists in basketball
Spanish people of Senegalese descent
Spanish sportspeople of African descent